The 1965 Minnesota Twins won the 1965 American League pennant with a 102–60 record. It was the team's first pennant since moving to Minnesota, and the 102 wins is a team record.

Regular season 
On April 27, in addition to being the game's winning pitcher, Camilo Pascual hit a grand slam in the first inning – the second of his career.  The Detroit Tigers' Dizzy Trout is the only pitcher to have done that before.

The Twins spent much of the summer in a race for first with the Baltimore Orioles.  On July 1, however, the Twins took first place and kept it, ultimately winning the pennant by seven games.

Six Twins made the All-Star Game (which was played in the Twins' home park, Metropolitan Stadium). First baseman Harmon Killebrew, shortstop Zoilo Versalles, outfielders Tony Oliva and Jimmie Hall, catcher Earl Battey, and pitcher Mudcat Grant all appeared in the game.

On September 26 at D.C. Stadium in Washington, D.C. – the city the Twins franchise called home until 1961 — the Twins beat the Washington Senators 2–1 to clinch the pennant. Jim Kaat was the winning pitcher.

Overall, 1,463,258 fans attended Twins games, the highest total in the American League.  During the season, the Twins played in front of their largest crowd ever (71,245 at Yankee Stadium on June 20) and their smallest crowd ever (537 at home, September 20).

Offense 
Versalles was named AL Most Valuable Player. He also led the team with 126 runs scored, and won a Gold Glove Award for his play at shortstop. Oliva led the AL with a .321 batting average. Killebrew was limited to 113 games by injuries, but still hit 25 HR and 75 RBI.

Pitching 
Grant led the league with 21 wins, becoming the first black pitcher in the history of the American League to win 20 games in a season. Kaat won the Gold Glove for pitchers.

Season standings

Record vs. opponents

Notable transactions 
 June 8, 1965: 1965 Major League Baseball draft
Del Unser was drafted by the Twins in the 2nd round, but did not sign.
Graig Nettles was drafted by the Twins in the 4th round.

Roster

Player stats

Batting

Starters by position
Note: Pos = Position; G = Games played; AB = At bats; H = Hits; Avg. = Batting average; HR = Home runs; RBI = Runs batted in

Other batters 
Note: G = Games played; AB = At bats; H = Hits; Avg. = Batting average; HR = Home runs; RBI = Runs batted in

Pitching

Starting pitchers 
Note: G = Games pitched; IP = Innings pitched; W = Wins; L = Losses; ERA = Earned run average; SO = Strikeouts

Other pitchers 
Note: G = Games pitched; IP = Innings pitched; W = Wins; L = Losses; ERA = Earned run average; SO = Strikeouts

Relief pitchers 
Note: G = Games pitched; W = Wins; L = Losses; SV = Saves; ERA = Earned run average; SO = Strikeouts

1965 World Series

Awards and honors 
 Zoilo Versalles, Shortstop, American League MVP
 Sam Mele, Associated Press AL Manager of the Year

Farm system 

LEAGUE CHAMPIONS: St. Cloud

Notes

References 
Player stats from www.baseball-reference.com
Team info from www.baseball-almanac.com

External links 
2005 book about the 1965 Minnesota Twins
Account of July 9 Killebrew home run

Minnesota Twins seasons
Minnesota Twins season
American League champion seasons
Minnesota Twins